Carl Braun (2 June 1886, Meisenheim, Hesse-Nassau – 24 April 1960, Hamburg) was a German bass opera singer.

Biography
He was born on 2 June 1886 in Meisenheim, Hesse-Nassau in Germany.

A pupil of the Berlin Imperial Opera, he sang with the Wiesbaden Royal Opera, Vienna Imperial Opera, Berlin City Opera, Metropolitan Opera, and the Berlin State Opera. He was actor Hermann Braun's father, Carl Braun, was an early sympathizer with the Nazis and a member of the anti-semitic Kampfbund für deutsche Kultur,

In 1932, he joined the Nazi Party. He died on 24 April 1960 in Hamburg, Germany.

References 

1886 births
1960 deaths
People from Bad Kreuznach (district)
People from Hesse-Nassau
German operatic basses
Nazi Party members
Militant League for German Culture members
20th-century German male opera singers